Minister of the Navy may refer to:
 Minister of the Navy (France)
 Minister of the Navy (Italy)
 Minister of the Navy (Japan)
 Minister of the Navy (Netherlands)
 Minister of the Navy and Postal Affairs